Chondrula tridens is a species of air-breathing land snail, a terrestrial pulmonate gastropod mollusk in the family Enidae. 

Subspecies
 Chondrula tridens eximia (Rossmässler, 1835)
 Chondrula tridens martynovi Gural-Sverlova & Gural, 2010
 Chondrula tridens tridens (O. F. Müller, 1774)

Distribution 
The distribution of this species is Pontic and southern-European.

This species occurs in:
 Czech Republic
 Ukraine

References

External links

Enidae
Gastropods described in 1774
Taxa named by Otto Friedrich Müller